A naval race had developed in the Aegean after the end of the Balkan Wars, with the Ottoman government ordering several ships, including two dreadnoughts, in Britain. In the event, with the outbreak of World War I, one of these ships, including further two scout cruisers and four destroyers, were confiscated and pressed into service with the Royal Navy. This disappointed the Ottomans, contributing to their joining the Central Powers in the Great War.

Despite these drawbacks, during World War I the Ottoman Navy saw much action against the Russian, British, and French fleets in the Black Sea, Aegean Sea and the Sea of Marmara.

The ships of the Ottoman Navy in World War I

Dreadnoughts

The two dreadnoughts,  and  that had been ordered by the Ottoman government, were never handed over despite the fact that they had both been completed in Britain. Prior to this occurrence, Sultân Osmân-ı Evvel had been constructed by Armstrong Whitworth for the Brazilian Navy in 1911 under the name  due to naval rivalries with Argentina. These were eventually resolved in 1913. After the conflict Brazil turned down its order, but the Armstrong Whitworth company did not scrap the ship as it could be sold to other potential customers, among them the Ottoman Empire. In August 1914, the former was transferred to the Royal Navy.

Battle cruisers

The German battlecruiser  was transferred to the Ottoman Navy in November 1914 and renamed to Yavûz Sultân Selîm. She was involved from 29 October 1914 till the end of the war in bombarding Russian ports on the Black Sea coast. During the Great War, she was still largely manned and commanded by the German Imperial Navy. She remained in the Turkish Navy after the war, was renamed Yavûz Selîm in 1930 and then Yavûz in 1936, refitted twice soon after this in 1938 and 1941 and scrapped in 1971.

Pre-dreadnought battleships

Barbaros Hayreddin was sunk by the British submarine  whilst on patrol with two destroyers.

Coastal defense ships

, the Ottoman Navy’s only coastal defense ship, was torpedoed and sunk by the British submarine , commanded by Lt. Norman Holbrook, on 13 December 1914 off Chanak in the Dardanelles. When the submarine got back to base, Holbrook was awarded the Victoria Cross.

Protected cruisers

Mecidiye was sunk in the Black Sea off Odessa while in company with Hamidiye and four torpedo boats from a single Russian mine. She was refloated by the Russians and renamed  in June 1915, later being returned to the Ottoman Navy in May 1918 after the Germans captured Ukraine.

Light cruisers

The Ottoman Navy acquired during the Great War the light cruiser Midilli (formerly the German ). She served with the SMS Goeben in many raids against Russian shipping and ports from late October 1914. Midilli was sunk in the Aegean Sea on 20 January 1918 whilst with the SMS Goeben by five Allied mines.

Destroyers 

Yarhisar was sunk by the British submarine  December 1915, Gayret-i Vataniye ran aground October 1916 and was abandoned, Yâdigâr-ı Millet was bombed by British aircraft July 1917, raised and scrapped.

Torpedo boats 

The Ottoman Navy possessed the old torpedo boat Berk Efşân.

Submarines 

In 1910, the first and thus far only (modern)  submarine operated by the Ottoman Navy, Abdül Hamid (also Abdülhamid), was scrapped.  The Ottoman Empire did not have any submarines going into World War I but obtained  one operational submarine during the war.  , was the former French , which ran aground in the Dardanelles on 30 October 1915 and was captured by the Turks. She was returned to France in 1918.

Minelayers 
The Ottoman Navy also had several minelayers,  being the most famous. Her mines laid on 8 March 1915 sank three Allied ships in a small minefield of 20 mines on 18 March 1915. The British battle cruiser  was also badly damaged.

Armored Gunships

The ironclad  was built in 1867-71 at Blackwall, one of a group of 7 ships. Rebuilt in 1904-07 by the Italian Naval Shipyards Ansaldo of Genoa, she was of little military value by 1914.

Order of Battle, 1914 

On October 27, 1914, the main naval ships of the Ottoman Navy was organized as follows:

Naval Minister: Ferik Djemal Pasha
 Fleet Commander: Admiral Wilhelm Souchon
 Chief of Staff: Admiral Arif

References and sources
 The Ottoman Navy in World War I, from Naval-History.net
 The War at Sea, from SparkNotes - Another good reference for World War I naval warfare.
 Turkish navy in WW1
 Jane, Fred T., ed., Jane's Fighting Ships 1914, reprinted Arco, New York, 1969.

Sources

Notes